Sri Mahamariamman Temple may refer to:
 Sri Mahamariamman Temple, Bangkok or Sri Mariamman Temple
 Sri Mahamariamman Temple, Kuala Lumpur
 Sri Mahamariamman Temple, Penang
 Sri Mariamman Temple, Singapore

See also
Mariamman Temple (disambiguation)